

History 
Operations started on  linking Moscow and Nizhny Novgorod, becoming the first regular services of the country. The name Aeroflot was adopted in 1932 after the reorganisation of Dobrolet. By the end of the 1930s the carrier had the following routes in operation: Kharkiv–Kyiv, Kharkiv–Odessa, Kyiv–Odessa, Kyiv–Rostov–Mineralnye Vody, Kyiv–Simferopol, Moscow–Leningrad, Moscow–Minsk, Moscow–Odessa, Moscow–Sochi, Moscow–Kuybishev, Moscow–Baku–Tbilisi, Moscow–Simferopol, Moscow–Stalingrad–Astrakhan, Tbilisi–Sukhumi, Tbilisi–Yerevan, Kutasi–Mestia and Sukhumi–Sochi.

By , the carrier operated an extensive domestic and international network that included Accra, Amsterdam, Bamako, Brussels, Cairo, Conakry, Copenhague, Delhi, Djakarta, Havana, Helsinki, Kabul, Karachi, Khartoum, London, Paris, Rabat, Rangoon, Stockholm and Vienna; routes to Algiers, Baghdad, Brazzaville, Colombo, Nicosia, Teheran and Tunis, all of them inaugurated in 1964, were also flown. At this time, the carrier had agreements with  countries but it only served  of them, including  destinations.

Once the world's largest carrier, Aeroflot did not restrict its operations to the transportation of passengers, but monopolised all civil aviation activities within the Soviet Union. Apart from passenger transportation that covered a domestic network of over 3,600 villages, towns and cities, activities undertaken by the airline that were labelled as "non-transport tasks" included agricultural work, ice reconnaissance, anti-forest fire patrol, and aeromedical services, among many others. It was gradually reorganised and renamed AeroflotRussian International Airlines (ARIA). In mid-2000, the name of the company was changed to simply .

At , Moscow Sheremetyevo was the carrier main base; the airport was also one of its hubs, along with Novosibirsk, St Petersburg and Vladivostok, from where it operated scheduled international services to Accra, Amman, Amsterdam, Ankara, Antalya, Athens, Baku, Bangkok, Barcelona, Beijing, Beirut, Belgrade, Berlin, Bishkek, Bourgas, Bratislava, Brussels, Bucharest, Budapest, Cairo, Calcutta, Casablanca, Chicago, Colombo, Conakry, Copenhagen, Cotonou, Dakar, Damascus, Delhi, Dhaka, Dnipropetrovsk, Dubai, Dublin, Düsseldorf, Frankfurt, Geneva, Gothenburg, Hamburg, Hanoi, Hanover, Havana, Helsinki, Ho Chi Minh City, Hong Kong, Istanbul, Jakarta, Karachi, Karlovy Vary, Kathmandu, Kaunas, Kuala Lumpur, Kyiv, Lagos, Larnaca, Lima, Lisbon, Ljubljana, London, Los Angeles, Luanda, Luleå, Luxembourg, Lyon, Madrid, Mahe Island, Male, Malta, Manila, Mexico City, Miami, Milan, Montreal, Mumbai, Munich, Nagoya, New York, Nice, Niigata, Osaka, Oslo, Paphos, Paris, Prague, Riga, Rome, Rovaniemi, Salzburg, San Francisco, São Paulo, Seattle, Seoul, Shanghai, Shannon, Sharjah, Shenyang, Simferopol, Singapore, Skopje, Sofia, Stockholm, Tbilisi, Tehran, Thessaloniki, Tivat, Tokyo, Toronto, Tripoli, Tromsø, Tunis, Ulaanbaatar, Varna, Venice, Vienna, Vilnius, Warsaw, Washington, Yerevan, Zagreb and Zurich, and domestic flights to Adler/Sochi, Anapa, Arkhangelsk, Belgorod, Bratsk, Ekaterinburg, Irkutsk, Kaliningrad, Khabarovsk, Krasnodar, Murmansk, Naryan-Mar, Nizhnevartovsk, Nizhniy Novgorod, Omsk, Petropavlovsk-Kamchatsky, Rostov, Samara, Volgograd and Yuzhno-Sakhalinsk.

List 
Following is a list of destinations the carrier flies to, according to its passenger and cargo schedules. Terminated destinations once served by Aeroflot within the  era are also included.

Notes and references

Notes

References

External links 
 

Aeroflot Online schedule

destinations
Lists of airline destinations
Russia transport-related lists
SkyTeam destinations